Middletown is a hamlet in Powys, Wales near the border with England. It is situated on the A458 road, between the towns of Shrewsbury and Welshpool. The X75 Bus Route  runs through the village runs to these towns. The Afon Pwll Bychan passes through the village. Middletown has many local sites, including Cefn y Castell and Breidden Hill. The nearest town to Middletown is Welshpool, which is situated 5 miles away.

Middletown is represented in the Welsh Parliament by Russell George (Conservative) and the UK Member of Parliament is Glyn Davies (Conservative).

Notes

Villages in Powys